Romeo Alexander Challenger (born 19 May 1950) is an English musician who has been the drummer for the rock band Showaddywaddy since 1973 and seminal Progressive Rock band Black Widow.

Biography 
Challenger was born 19 May 1950 in St. John's, Antigua, British Leeward Islands. In 1955, he moved with his family to England. He began playing the drums as a teenager in the mid-1960s. 

He played in several groups, including progressive  rock/hard rock band Black Widow in the early 1970s. In 1973, he became one of two drummers (The other being Malcolm Allured) for the rock and roll band Showaddywaddy. Showaddywaddy had ten singles reach the top ten of the UK Singles Chart, including the 1976 number-one "Under the Moon of Love".

Challenger played in the Leicester Boys' football team with Peter Shilton and Jeff Blockley, who both went on to enjoy professional careers. 

Challenger is the father of high jumper Ben Challenger, who won a silver medal in the 1998 Commonwealth Games, and a bronze medal four years later; and Tamzin Challenger, a musician best known for her material with bassline producer T2.

References

1950 births
Living people
People from St. John's, Antigua and Barbuda
Antigua and Barbuda emigrants to England
People from Leicester
English rock drummers
British male drummers
20th-century drummers
20th-century British musicians
20th-century British male musicians
21st-century drummers
21st-century British musicians
21st-century British male musicians
Black British rock musicians